Teddy Sagi (born 1971) is an Israeli billionaire businessman based in London and Cyprus. Sagi is the founder of the gambling software company Playtech and owner of London's Camden Market. His personal wealth is estimated at US$5 billion, with interests in real estate, gambling software, payments processing, and digital advertising.

Personal life
Sagi was born in 1971 in Tel Aviv, the only child of Ami Sagi, a businessman who owned a travel agency, and his wife Lizi, a cosmetician who sold make-up. He grew up in Tel Aviv's Shikun Lamed neighborhood.

In 1996 Sagi received a nine-month prison sentence after being convicted in Israel of bribery and fraud.

In 2009 Sagi obtained Cypriot citizenship as part of a 'golden visa' scheme by Cyprus government. As Cyprus is part of the European Union, Sagi obtained a Passport of the European Union. In 2013, The Guardian reported that Sagi had "been based in Cyprus for some years".

Since 2010, Sagi has been living with Yael Nizri, the 2006 Miss Israel, and they have two daughters together. Sagi owns the most expensive home in Israel, located in Herzliya. The home, which he bought in 2010, lies in the wealthy neighborhood of Herzliya Pituah on Galei Techelet Street, Israel's most expensive street. It is a 2,000 square meter house on a half-acre lot on the shore, and has a fitness room, wine cellar, sealed room, and an elevator to the beach. Sagi also owns two penthouses in Herzliya, and other homes in Tel Aviv (including an apartment in the Tzameret Towers purchased from former Israeli Prime Minister Ehud Barak), London's Knightsbridge, Cyprus, and Berlin.

Career 

On 2 January 2022, Forbes listed his net worth at US$5.7 billion.

Playtech 

Sagi founded Playtech in 1999. It was floated in 2006 on the London Stock Exchange at a price that valued the business at approximately £550 million. He has since scaled down his holdings to 4.6%, as opposed to 81% at the time of its IPO. He has since invested in hi-tech companies and real estate.

Hi-Tech

SafeCharge 
Sagi was majority shareholder (with 68% control) of the company, which is a credit card clearing company for the online gambling industry.

Primarily based in Bulgaria, SafeCharge was traded on London's AIM, with a market cap of £385 million. The company was listed on the Alternative Investment Market (AIM) of the London Stock Exchange.

In 2019, Nuvei Corporation announced its acquisition of SafeCharge, and agreed to pay $889 million in cash for it. In August 2019, Nuvei completed the acquisition.

Kape Technologies plc
Kape Technologies is a United Kingdom-based cybersecurity software company. Kape owns VPN services and cybersecurity tools, including CyberGhost, Private Internet Access (PIA), ZenMate, and Intego.

In late 2012, Sagi acquired the start-up company Crossrider for $37 million. The company went public on AIM at a value of $US 250M. Crossrider started off by making a software development kit (SDK) for the deployment of browser extensions to a variety of platforms with support for monetizing extensions. The monetization options were used by major ad injectors which used man-in-the-browser to change or add advertisements to what users saw. Over time, Crossrider's services became increasingly utilized by malware and adware developers and the company was unable to combat misuse.

In June 2016, following the appointment of new management team, the company changed its strategy to focus to cyber-security with a focus on digital privacy and protection of digital data. In practical terms, the company stopped its browser SDK business to focus on the VPN sector, purchasing CyberGhost VPN in 2017.

In March 2018, the name of the company was changed to Kape Technologies plc. Kape then purchased VPN carriers Zenmate in 2018 and Private Internet Access in 2019.

On September 13, 2021, Kape acquired ExpressVPN, raising concerns based on Kape Technologies' predecessor Crossrider's history of making tools that were used for adware. It also acquired the VPN review publisher Webselenese in 2021.

Stucco Media 
In 2015 Sagi acquired the start-up company Stucco Media for $43 million. The acquisition was made by Market Tech, and the company is now owned by him. Stucco Media develops eCommerce website technology.

Glispa 
Also in 2015, Sagi acquired the German start-up for €32 million. Glispa is an advertising company, mainly via mobile phones.

Mobfox 
In November 2018, Sagi acquired the mobile advertising company Mobfox from Matomy Media for $7.5 million.

Real estate

Camden Market 
Camden Market Holdings, the owner of Camden Market, Stables Market and Camden Lock Developments was bought by Sagi in March 2014 for £400 million ($664 million) from Bebo Kobo (50% owner), and Richard Caring and Elliott Bernerd for 2.3-2.6Bn ILS, which later turned out to be the biggest LSE IPO of 2015. Sagi has continued to buy property in the Camden Market area and as of March 2015, owns the four most important of the six sections of the market, London's second most popular tourist attraction after Buckingham Palace.

In July 2017 Sagi has completed delisting Market Tech from the LSE, at a value of 1.1Bn ILS.

Sagi intends to invest £300 million in developing the market area by 2018.

Other real estate ventures 
In June 2017 Sagi acquired 44% of Brack Capital Properties N.V, which is a listed real estate company, owning and developing residential and commercial properties in Germany.

Sagi is also reported to enter the co-working share workspace sector with an international brand LABS. The first location is slated to open in London.

In August 2015, The GoodVision Trust (beneficiary Teddy Sagi) sold a 24.79% stake of Austrian real-estate company  Immobilien Invest SE to the German real-estate company Adler Real Estate AG. The market value of these shares was 250 million euros.

In March 2020, Labtech, the property investment firm owned by Teddy Sagi, completed the sale of Holborn Links Estate for 245 million euros to investors Tristan Capital Partners and Cording Real Estate Group.

Wealth
According to Forbes, Sagi has a net worth of $5.6 billion, and is the fourth-richest person in Israel.

He was one of 565 Israelis listed in the Pandora Papers, published by the International Consortium of Investigative Journalists, according to Shomrim, an Israeli investigative journalism nonprofit organization that took part in the investigation.

References

1971 births
Living people
Israeli Jews
People from Tel Aviv
Israeli expatriates in the United Kingdom
Israeli businesspeople
Israeli company founders
Israeli billionaires
Israeli fraudsters
Israeli people convicted of bribery
Cypriot Jews
Naturalized citizens of Cyprus
People named in the Panama Papers
Cypriot billionaires
Cypriot businesspeople